Horace Billings Packer (October 11, 1851 – April 13, 1940) was a Republican member of the U.S. House of Representatives from Pennsylvania.

Horace B. Packer was born in Wellsboro, Pennsylvania.  He attended the common schools, the Wellsboro Academy, and Alfred University in Alfred, New York.  He studied law, and was admitted to the bar of Tioga County, Pennsylvania, in 1873 and commenced practice in Wellsboro.  He was also engaged in the real estate business.  He served as district attorney of Tioga County from 1875 to 1879.  Packer was elected to the Pennsylvania State House of Representatives in 1884 and reelected in 1886.  He was a member of the Pennsylvania State Senate from 1888 to 1892.  He served many years as a member of the borough council, and presided over the Republican State conventions of 1893 and 1894.

Packer was elected as a Republican to the Fifty-fifth and Fifty-sixth Congresses.  He was not a candidate for renomination in 1900.  He resumed the practice of law in Wellsboro, and was also engaged in the real estate, banking, and lumber businesses.  He was a delegate to the 1924 Republican National Convention.  He died in Wellsboro in 1940.  Interment in Wellsboro Cemetery.

Sources

The Political Graveyard

External links
 

1851 births
1940 deaths
Republican Party Pennsylvania state senators
Republican Party members of the Pennsylvania House of Representatives
Alfred University alumni
People from Wellsboro, Pennsylvania
Republican Party members of the United States House of Representatives from Pennsylvania